Kalli station is a railway station in Hyongjesan-guyŏk, P'yŏngyang, North Korea. It is on located on the P'yŏngra and P'yŏngŭi lines of the Korean State Railway.

History
The station was originally opened on 11 February 1934 by the Chosen Government Railway.

References

Railway stations in North Korea